Liconsa S.A. de C.V. is a Mexican parastatal company subsidized by the Federal government of Mexico depending on the Secretariat of Social Development. Created as part of a series of social support programs, its function is industrialize and commercialize premium grade milk bags at very low cost to feed, nurture and help the physical development and to improve the quality of life on people in extreme poverty and in social vulnerability.

In 1944, the Milk Supply Welfare Program was implemented with the opening of the first milk-producing plant, under the name "Nacional Distribuidora y Reguladora, S. A. de C. V." (Nadyrsa).

In 1945, a group of businessmen, aware of the increasing in offer of milk in Mexico City, established “Lechería Nacional, S. A. de C. V.” By 1950, "Compañía Exportadora e Importadora Mexicana, S. A." (CEIMSA) took on the elaboration, distribution and selling activities of imported milk, which was reprocessed in Mexico to ensure high quality and reasonable cost for disadvantaged families.

The plant of Liconsa located in Tlalnepantla de Baz started operating in 1954. This facility produces today the largest volume of milk in comparison to the other industrial units; its initial milk rehydrating capacity was of 30,000 liters a day, currently it produces 1,230,000 liters of milk every day.

In 1961, the Federal Government decided to establish "Compañía Rehidratadora de Leche CEIMSA, S. A."; then in 1963, the company changed its name to "Compañía Rehidratadora de Leche Conasupo, S. A." Afterwards, in 1972, the name was modified again to "Leche Industrializada Conasupo, S. A. de C. V." Finally, in 1994, during the reorganization process of the Secretariat of Social Development, the company was named Liconsa, S. A. de C.V.

Today, is majorly a state-owned business devoted to the industrialization of high-quality milk and its distribution at subsidized prices, in order to contribute to the proper nutrition of millions of disadvantaged Mexicans, especially children under 12, as well as other vulnerable sectors of the population, such as women between 13 and 15 years of age, pregnant or lactating mothers, women between 45 and 59 years of age, people with chronic diseases or physically impaired, as well as elderly citizens (60 and more).

Liconsa’s milk is fortified with the main nutritional elements of which most of the disadvantaged population (specially children and elderly citizens) lacks of: iron, zinc, folic acid and vitamins A, C, D, Riboflavin and Cobalamin.

Several studies made by the National Institute of Public Health in México, show that children consuming Liconsa’s fortified milk frequently, present lower anemia, iron deficiency and chronic malnourishment rates; they grow taller and develop more muscle mass; they also show higher physical capacity and an improved mental development.

External links
official website